Cyperus callistus is a species of sedge that is native to an area of southern Africa.

The species was first formally described by the botanist Henry Nicholas Ridley in 1884.

See also
 List of Cyperus species

References

callistus
Taxa named by Henry Nicholas Ridley
Plants described in 1884
Flora of Kenya
Flora of South Africa
Flora of Angola
Flora of Benin
Flora of Tanzania
Flora of Zambia
Flora of Zimbabwe